Björn Vleminckx (born 1 December 1985) is a Belgian former professional footballer who played as a forward.

Career
Born in Boom, Antwerp, Vleminckx began his career with Beveren and joined in July 2005 Oostende on loan. In summer 2006 he signed with KV Mechelen.

In June 2009, he signed a four-year contract until July 2013 with N.E.C. who paid a transfer of €1.8 million to Mechelen for the 23-year-old striker. At N.E.C. he became the top goalscorer in the Eredivisie during the 2010–11 season, with 23 goals.

In March 2011, Vleminckx signed a contract starting from June 2011 at Club Brugge. Brugge paid €3.3 million to NEC as transfer sum.

In January 2013, Vleminckx signed a loan contract until end of season 2012–2013 at Gençlerbirliği. In his first match with the club, he had a successful debut in scoring four goals in a 5–3 win against Antalyaspor.

In June 2013, he signed a two-year contract with Kayseri Erciyesspor.

In August 2016, he agreed to the termination of his contract with Göztepe.

In August 2016, Vleminckx moved to the Belgian Second Division team Antwerp agreeing a two-year contract. A year later, after the club had reached promotion to the Belgian First Division A, it was announced he was no longer part of the club's plans and that he would be allowed to train with the first team.

He trained with the reserve team of Antwerp in nearly two years but however decided to stay at the club until his contract ran out in July 2019. Already in February 2019 it was confirmed, that Vleminckx would join FC Oppuurs ahead of the 2019/20 season. The transfer was also confirmed by Vleminckx himself on 29 May 2019.

Career statistics

Club

Notes

Honours
Individual
 Eredivisie top scorer: 2010–11
 Best sportsman of Nijmegen 2011

References

External links
 
 

1985 births
Living people
People from Boom, Belgium
Belgian footballers
Association football forwards
Belgium international footballers
K.S.K. Beveren players
K.V. Oostende players
K.V. Mechelen players
NEC Nijmegen players
Club Brugge KV players
Gençlerbirliği S.K. footballers
Kayseri Erciyesspor footballers
Göztepe S.K. footballers
Royal Antwerp F.C. players
Challenger Pro League players
Belgian Pro League players
Eredivisie players
Süper Lig players
Belgian expatriate footballers
Belgian expatriate sportspeople in the Netherlands
Expatriate footballers in the Netherlands
Belgian expatriate sportspeople in Turkey
Expatriate footballers in Turkey
Footballers from Antwerp Province